Hung Mong-kai (born 1 January 1983) is a Taiwanese politician who sits in the 10th Legislative Yuan, representing the New Taipei City Constituency I.

References 

1983 births
Living people
New Taipei Members of the Legislative Yuan
Kuomintang Members of the Legislative Yuan in Taiwan
University of Southern California alumni
Yuan Ze University alumni
Members of the 10th Legislative Yuan